Yayah Kallon (born 30 June 2001) is a Sierra Leonean professional footballer who plays as a forward for  club Hellas Verona, on loan from Genoa. He mainly plays in forward.

Career
In 2018, Kallon signed for Italian Serie D side Savona, after having trialed for Virtus Entella in the Serie C. On 22 May 2021, he debuted for Genoa in a 1–0 Serie A win over Cagliari. On 13 August 2021, Kallon scored his first goal for Genoa, in a 3–2 Coppa Italia win over Perugia.

On 26 August 2022, Kallon joined Hellas Verona on loan with an option to buy and a conditional obligation to buy.

References

External links
 
 

2001 births
Living people
People from Kono District
Sierra Leonean footballers
Association football forwards
Savona F.B.C. players
Genoa C.F.C. players
Hellas Verona F.C. players
Serie D players
Serie A players
Sierra Leonean expatriate footballers
Sierra Leonean expatriate sportspeople in Italy
Expatriate footballers in Italy